Dashkasan (also Romanized as Dāshkasan and Dashkesan) is a village in Sina Rural District, in the Central District of Varzaqan County, East Azerbaijan Province, Iran. At the 2006 census, its population was 155, in 39 families.

References 

Towns and villages in Varzaqan County